Holly Weber (born September 20, 1984) is an American glamour model and actress. As a model, she has appeared in magazines such as Maxim, FHM, Muscle & Fitness and Glamour; and in website AskMen's Top 99 Most Desirable Women of 2009. She has made uncredited appearances in a number of movies and TV series.

Early life
Holly Weber was born in Loma Linda, California and spent the majority of her formative years in Southern California. She lived in Costa Rica for three months as a child.

While pursuing an orthodontics degree in college, Weber supported herself by waiting tables at a local restaurant.

Modeling career
Weber was discovered at a nightclub in Las Vegas, and was invited to work as a go-go dancer in Las Vegas and Hollywood. Afterwards she auditioned for various modeling opportunities, and started modeling at the age of 18. She appeared in magazines such as Maxim, FHM, Muscle & Fitness and Glamour.

Weber appeared at no. 66 on AskMen's Top 99 Most Desirable Women of 2009.

Filmography
Aside from her career in modeling, she has appeared in the following movies and TV series:

Frost/Nixon (2008, uncredited)
Tropic Thunder (2008, uncredited)
You Don't Mess with the Zohan (2008, uncredited)
Criminal Minds (2008, uncredited)
The Ugly Truth (2009, uncredited)
Crank: High Voltage (2009, uncredited)
Fast & Furious (2009, uncredited)
Miss March (2009, uncredited)
The Devil's Tomb (2009, uncredited)

References

External links

 

Living people
Female models from California
Glamour models
American film actresses
American television actresses
1984 births
People from Loma Linda, California
21st-century American women